Grow – Speed – Injection is the second studio album by Swamp Terrorists, released in March 1992 by Machinery Records.

Track listing

Personnel
Adapted from the Grow – Speed – Injection liner notes.

Swamp Terrorists
 Michael Antener (as STR) – electronics, programming, design, recording and mixing (9)
 Ane Hebeisen (as Ane H.) – lead vocals, photography, design

Production and design
 Jor Jenka (as Jor) – executive-producer
 Ludwig – design
 Sandra S. – photography
 Klaus Röthlisberger – recording and mixing (9)
 Hans Ulrich – recording, mixing, mastering

Release history

References

External links 
 

1992 albums
Swamp Terrorists albums
Machinery Records albums